Hans Óttar Lindberg Tómasson (born 1 August 1981) is a Danish handball player of Icelandic descent for Füchse Berlin and the Danish national team.

He won the 2008 European Men's Handball Championship and the 2012 European Men's Handball Championship with the Danish national team. He currently plays for Füchse Berlin.

He is of Icelandic descent as both of Lindberg's parents, Tómas Erling Lindberg and Sigrún Sigurðardóttir, are Icelandic. His parents played handball in Iceland with Fimleikafélag Hafnarfjarðar. He had Icelandic citizenship until he was 18. His paternal grandparents immigrated to Iceland from Suduroy on the Faroe Islands in the mid-1940s.

He is sometimes referred to as the Icelander on the Danish national team in Icelandic media. He understands Icelandic in conversation but is unable or refuses to speak Icelandic when speaking to media.

Career
Hans Lindberg started his career in Team Helsinge. In 2006 Team Helsinge merged with Hillerød HK, and is now Nordsjælland Håndbold.

Hans Lindberg became the 2009–2010, 2012–2013, and 2021–2022 season's Bundesliga Best Goal Scorer

He won 2012–13 EHF Champions League with HSV Hamburg, becoming top scorer in the tournament.

Individual awards
All-Star Right wing of the World Championship: 2013
Top scorer EHF Champions League: 2012–2013.
Top scorer of the Handball-Bundesliga (HBL): 2009–2010, 2012–2013, 2021–2022

References

External links

Hans Lindberg at Kindaling.de

1981 births
Living people
Danish male handball players
Olympic handball players of Denmark
Handball players at the 2008 Summer Olympics
Handball players at the 2012 Summer Olympics
Danish people of Icelandic descent
Viborg HK players
Handball-Bundesliga players
Expatriate handball players
Danish expatriate sportspeople in Germany
Füchse Berlin Reinickendorf HBC players
People from Høje-Taastrup Municipality
Sportspeople from Region Zealand
Sportspeople from the Capital Region of Denmark